We the People (stylized onscreen as We The People) is an American talk show aired on CBS Television (1948-1949) and then on NBC Television (1949-1952).

Broadcast history
We the People was a 30-minute talk show, first on CBS for one season and then on NBC for two seasons. The host interviewed politicians, celebrities, and everyday people. The interviews tended to be "up close and personal", interviewing celebrities about difficulties they had to overcome. The non-celebrities were usually people who participated in some type of charitable work. The show was sponsored by Gulf Oil and produced by Life magazine.

The TV show aired Tuesdays at 9pm ET, and then Fridays at 8:30pm ET, and was simulcast on radio and TV for a time. The show had been aired on CBS Radio since 1936. In October 1948, We the People was rated #3 on the Hooper Ratings, Hooper being a precursor to Nielsen ratings. On October 24, 1949, NBC began broadcasting We the People from 8:30 to 9 p.m. Eastern Time on Fridays. It originated from WNBT.

Gulf Oil ended its sponsorship of the program on September 26, 1952.

Famous episodes

On August 17, 1948, the American ex-Soviet spy Elizabeth Bentley appeared on the show to urge follow ex-spies to come forward and name names to the U.S. Government. "It isn't enough to just quit being a Communist as I know hundreds have. Come forward now and tell what you know while there's still time to undo the damage we have so foolishly done."

See also
1948-49 United States network television schedule
1949-50 United States network television schedule
1950-51 United States network television schedule
1951-52 United States network television schedule

References

External links

CBS original programming
NBC original programming
1948 American television series debuts
1952 American television series endings
Black-and-white American television shows